Snyk is a Boston-based cybersecurity company specializing in cloud computing. It was founded in 2015 out of London and Tel Aviv with headquarters in Boston.

History
Snyk was founded in 2015 by Guy Podjarny (גיא פודחרני), Assaf Hefetz (אסף חפץ), and Danny Grander, (דני גרנדר) coming from Unit 8200, a SIGINT unit of the Israel Defense Forces. Guy Podjarny was initially the CEO, but in July 2019, he was succeeded by Peter McKay, one of the first investors. Meanwhile, Podjarny became president and chairman of the Board of Directors. As of 2022, the company has approximately 1,400 employees. Headquartered in Boston, it also has offices in Tel Aviv, Ottawa, Zurich and London.

In  2020, it was listed as 39th in the Forbes Cloud 100.

Acquisitions
Snyk has acquired a number of companies including DeepCode, Manifold, FossID and CloudSkiff.

DeepCode provided what became Snyk Code, a product for static application security testing. Snyk Code is a cloud-based, AI-powered code review platform that checks, tests, and debugs code. It uses machine learning to check for mistakes in code. The platform currently supports Java, JavaScript, Python, and TypeScript.

FossID  brought in its expertise in scanning and looking for vulnerabilities in C/C++ applications, as well as the capability to identify pieces of code copied from the internet, e.g., from stackoverflow, which could contain vulnerabilities.

CloudSkiff was known for its open source tool for drift detection (detection of changes in the outside environment which may invalidate software infrastructure configuration, database setup, etc.)

Financing history
In 2016 the company initially raised $3 million. In March 2018, its Series A funding was $7 million. In late 2019 it raised $70 million and further $150 million in January 2020. In September 2021 a series F funding round valued the company at $8.5 billion. This came 6 months after a valuation of $4.7 billion. Qatar Investment Authority led the next funding round in December 2022 with Snyk raising close to $200 million.

In December 2021 Bloomberg reported that Snyk was preparing for an IPO in 2022.

Products
The company’s security products are designed to help software developers find weaknesses, violations, and vulnerabilities in their code. The company’s vulnerability database records security issues found in open-source software libraries, and corrects the code. Security vulnerabilities are identified and addressed during the development process, before the software product is in use.

References

External links
 

Computer security companies
Companies based in Boston
American companies established in 2015
Israeli companies established in 2015